Hallerian physiology was a theory competing with galvanism in Italy in the late 18th century. It is named after Albrecht von Haller, a Swiss physician who is considered the father of neurology.

The Hallerians' fundamental tenet held that muscular movements were produced by a mechanical force, different from life and from the nervous system, and which operated beyond consciousness. The activity of this function could be controlled in dead and dissected animals by touching a metal knife to the muscle fiber or by a spark being discharged on them. The electricity operated only as a stimulus of irritability, and it was irritability which was the one, true cause of the contractions.

Sources 

The Controversy on Animal Electricity in Eighteenth-Century Italy: Galvani, Volta and Others by Walter Bernardi

Neurophysiology